Everywhere is the third best-of album released by Japanese singer Maaya Sakamoto to celebrate her career's 15th anniversary.

Track listing

Charts

References

Maaya Sakamoto albums
2010 compilation albums
FlyingDog compilation albums